A list of films released in Japan in 1964 (see 1964 in film).

List of films

See also 
1964 in Japan
1964 in Japanese television

References

Footnotes

Sources

External links
Japanese films of 1964 at the Internet Movie Database

1964
Japanese
Films